Freedom Highway may refer to:
 Freedom Highway (Rhiannon Giddens album), a 2017 album
 Freedom Highway (The Staple Singers album), a 1965 album
 Freedom Highways campaign
 Down Liberty Road, a 1956 American short film also known as Freedom Highway